Desmopuntius rhomboocellatus, the snakeskin barb, is a species of cyprinid fish endemic to Borneo where it is found in western and central Kalimantan.  This species reaches a length of  TL. The specific rhomboocellatus refers to the rhomboid ocellus markings of the flanks, which sometimes gives rise to the common name "Snakeskin barb".

References 

Desmopuntius
Freshwater fish of Indonesia
Taxa named by Frederik Petrus Koumans
Fish described in 1940